WZMO-LP (104.7 FM) is a radio station licensed to serve the community of Marion, Ohio. The station is owned by Marion Community Radio. It airs a community radio format.

The station was assigned the WZMO-LP call letters by the Federal Communications Commission on May 12, 2014.

References

External links
 Official Website
 

ZMO-LP
ZMO-LP
Radio stations established in 2014
2014 establishments in Ohio
Community radio stations in the United States
Marion County, Ohio